Davidge Data Systems Corporation was "a privately held software company that specializes in middleware for trade ordering, execution and back-office connectivity for Wall Street firms," including Smart order routing.

The company's DavNet includes the ability to efficiently handle large volumes of small orders.

History
Davidge, founded 1982, was acquired by S1 Corporation, a holding company, in April, 2000, at a time when it seemed that "banks in the U.S. were going to control much of the retail brokerage" industry, especially as related to online trading. S1 sold Davidge to Paris-based GL-trade in October, 2003.

At that time, Davidge software was used for "40% of US listed options volume and served "40 New York Stock Exchange members ... and several of the 10 largest brokerage firms."

Their international order routing includes Canada and Britain.

References

External links
Dan Hollings Plan Review

Electronic trading systems